Gwendoline Didier (born 3 October 1986 in Enghien-les-Bains, Val-d'Oise) is a French former competitive figure skater. She is the 2008 French national champion and the 2004 & 2010 national bronze medalist.

Programs

Competitive highlights
GP: Grand Prix; JGP: Junior Grand Prix

References

External links 

 

1986 births
Living people
People from Enghien-les-Bains
French female single skaters
Figure skaters at the 2007 Winter Universiade
Sportspeople from Val-d'Oise
Competitors at the 2009 Winter Universiade